Richard Holland (c. 1549–1618), of Denton Hall, Manchester and Heaton Hall, Lancashire, was an English politician.

He was a Member (MP) of the Parliament of England for Lancashire in 1586.

References

1549 births
1618 deaths
English MPs 1586–1587
Members of the Parliament of England (pre-1707) for Lancashire